Nexus: The Gaming Connection was a magazine published by Task Force Games.

Contents
Nexus: The Gaming Connection included in every issue new scenarios for featured Task Force games, as well as hints on strategy and tactics.

Reception
Jerry Silbermann reviewed Nexus: The Gaming Connection in The Space Gamer No. 62. Silbermann commented that "Nexus is what is generally termed as a 'house organ.'  If you are a Task Force gamer, you will find that the good points outweigh the bad points, and you will probably enjoy Nexus.  Star Fleet Battles players will definitely get their money's worth with this magazine.  Needless to say, if you don't play Task Force games, this publication isn't for you."

References

Game magazines
Star Fleet Battles